Owosso is the largest city in Shiawassee County in the U.S. state of Michigan. The population was 15,194 at the 2010 census.  The city is mostly surrounded by Owosso Township on its west, but the two are administered autonomously.  The city was named after Chief Wosso, an Ojibwe leader of the Shiawassee area.

History 
Alfred L. and Benjamin O. Williams were early European-American settlers in the area. They were joined by Elias Comstock, who built the first permanent home in the settlement. Dr. John B. Barnes, a physician and a judge, and Sophronia King Barnes moved to Owosso in 1842. They lived on Oliver and Water streets where they operated an Underground Railroad waystation, where they provided aid and shelter for enslaved African Americans.

Owosso was incorporated as a city in 1859, at which time it had 1000 people. The city's first mayor was Amos Gould, a judge originally from New York. Many other settlers also migrated across the Northern Tier from New York and New England. In 1876, the city organized its fire department.

The pattern of settlement and migration resulted in a majority-white city. In the 1950s, Owosso was reported by a major Montgomery, Alabama, newspaper to be a sundown town, where African Americans were not allowed to live or stay overnight.

Geography
The city is on the Shiawassee River.

Climate
Owosso experiences frigid winters, with the last snow usually falling in April, typically Northern Midwestern spring thaws, balmy to hot summers, and colorful falls, with the first snows usually occurring sometimes in December but typically in January.  Each year Owosso averages eleven days with temperatures below , and nine days with temperatures above . Owosso averages twenty-nine inches of rain per year, and forty-one inches of snow.  The average growing season in Owosso is 144 days.

Demographics

2000 census
As of the census of 2000, there were 15,713 people, 6,340 households, and 4,076 families. The racial makeup of the city was 97% White, 0.20% African American, 0.60% Native American, 0.40% Asian, 0.80% from other races, and 1.10% from two or more races. Hispanic or Latino of any race were 3% of the population.

There were 6,340 households, out of which 33.5% had children under the age of 18 living with them, 45.0% were married couples living together, 14.6% had a female householder with no husband present, and 35.7% were non-families. 29.8% of all households were made up of individuals, and 12.6% had someone living alone who was 65 years of age or older.  The average household size was 2.45 and the average family size was 3.03.

In the city, the population was spread out, with 27.3% under the age of 18, 9.8% from 18 to 24, 29.4% from 25 to 44, 19.9% from 45 to 64, and 13.5% who were 65 years of age or older.  The median age was 34 years. For every 100 females, there were 89.3 males.  For every 100 females age 18 and over, there were 84.0 males.

The median income for a household in the city was $32,576, and the median income for a family was $40,355. Males had a median income of $32,285 versus $22,534 for females. The per capita income for the city was $16,764.  About 10.0% of families and 13.2% of the population were below the poverty line, including 16.8% of those under age 18 and 6.9% of those age 65 or over.

2010 census
As of the census of 2010, there were 15,194 people, 6,161 households, and 3,779 families residing in the city. The racial makeup of the city was 95.7% White, 0.8% African American, 0.5% Native American, 0.3% Asian, 0.6% from other races, and 2.1% from two or more races. Hispanic or Latino of any race were 3.9% of the population.

There were 6,161 households, of which 33.1% had children under the age of 18 living with them, 39.0% were married couples living together, 16.7% had a female householder with no husband present, 5.7% had a male householder with no wife present, and 38.7% were non-families. 31.9% of all households were made up of individuals, and 12.5% had someone living alone who was 65 years of age or older. The average household size was 2.41 and the average family size was 3.00.

The median age in the city was 34.8 years. 25.2% of residents were under the age of 18; 11.5% were between the ages of 18 and 24; 25.9% were from 25 to 44; 24.7% were from 45 to 64; and 12.8% were 65 years of age or older. The gender makeup of the city was 48.4% male and 51.6% female.

Arts and culture

Curwood Castle was the writing studio of notable author James Oliver Curwood. It is listed on the National Register of Historic Places. The castle is operated as a museum that contains period antiques, and Curwood books, photos, and movie posters, as well as memorabilia related to politician Thomas E. Dewey, another notable native son.
The Shiawasse Arts Center exhibits and sells prints of Frederick Carl Frieseke, and original work of other artists. It also holds art classes, and competitions, and has exhibitions scheduled throughout the year.
Owosso Speedway
 

 The American Record Pressing Company, accredited for The Beatles first vinyl pressing in the United States 

The Curwood Festival, to honor the author and books, is held annually and includes a street fair, parades, contests including raft races, carnival rides, concerts, a medieval reenactment encampment, and more.

Government
The city has a council–manager form of government.
Owosso is served by the Shiawassee District Library branch.

Education
Education is provided by the Owosso Public Schools, which owns the historic Lincoln School on Michigan Avenue south of M-21. Owosso High School is the sole high school in the city.

Salem Lutheran School is a grade school (Pre-K-8) of the Wisconsin Evangelical Lutheran Synod in Owosso.

Transportation

Roads
 runs east and west through the city
 runs north and south through the city
 runs diagonally, southeast and northwest, terminating at M-21

City Bus Service
The Shiawassee Area Transportation Agency (SATA) provides city bus service.  The majority of buses are lift-equipped, and the service operates from 6:00 a.m. to 10:00 p.m. on Mondays through Fridays.  The service also provides a single daily bus run to and from Perry, Michigan, and another to and from Durand, Michigan.

Intercity Bus Service
Owosso is the headquarters of Indian Trails Bus Lines, which provides regularly scheduled intercity bus service from Owosso to connect with points throughout Michigan and the U. S. Indian Trails also provides chartered bus service to and from points throughout the U. S.

Air

Rail
Owosso is the headquarters of the Great Lakes Central Railroad, which provides freight service to Northern and Southern Michigan. It also provides chartered passenger rail service and tours through its association with Lake Central Rail Tours. Owosso was the location of three different railroad stations for different railroad companies: Ann Arbor Railroad (Elberta, Michigan - Toledo, Ohio); New York Central Railroad, nee Michigan Central (Bay City - Jackson) and Grand Trunk Western (Muskegon - Detroit).

Notable people

 Emile Benoit (Jerry Urick), author, playwright of A Midsummer Night's Hangover.
 Alvin M. Bentley, philanthropist, foreign service officer and U.S. Congressman
 Leann Birch, developmental psychologist
 Chester Brewer, athlete, Michigan State and Missouri football head coach and athletic director
 Diane Carey, author
 James Oliver Curwood, conservationist and author
 Thomas E. Dewey, lawyer, author, and politician, Governor of New York, 1944 and 1948 Republican presidential candidate
 Frederick Carl Frieseke, American Impressionist artist 
 Sanford M. Green, Michigan jurist and legislator
 Alfred D. Hershey, bacteriologist and co-winner of the 1969 Nobel Prize in medicine/physiology
 Etta Doane Marden (1851-1946), American missionary in Turkey, 1881-1925
 Mel Schacher, member of the rock bands ? and the Mysterians and Grand Funk Railroad
 Scott Kinsey, keyboardist and member of the band Tribal Tech
 Rob Oliver, Emmy nominated animation director for The Simpsons.
 Cora Taylor, co-founder of Owosso's Indian Trails Bus Line
 C. Warren Thornthwaite, Professor of Climatology at Johns Hopkins University
 John Tomac, bicycle racer and builder
 Brad Van Pelt, football player, Michigan State and 14-year NFL career, 5-time Pro Bowl selection
 Bradlee Van Pelt, football player
 Lloyd R. Welch, Professor Emeritus at the University of Southern California

See also 

McArthur Mining Company – Michigan's first coal mine.

References

External links

Owosso History

Cities in Shiawassee County, Michigan
Micropolitan areas of Michigan
Sundown towns in Michigan
Populated places established in 1859
1859 establishments in Michigan